The 1977 Mutual Benefit Life Open, also known as the South Orange Open, was a men's tennis tournament played on outdoor clay courts at the Orange Lawn Tennis Club in South Orange, New Jersey in the United States. It was classified as a Two Star category tournament and was part of the 1977 Grand Prix circuit. It was the eight edition of the tournament on the Grand Prix circuit and was held from July 31 through August 8, 1977. First-seeded Guillermo Vilas won the singles title.

Finals

Singles
 Guillermo Vilas defeated  Roscoe Tanner 6–4, 6–1
 It was Vilas' 8th singles title of the year and the 27th of his career.

Doubles
 Colin Dibley /  Wojciech Fibak defeated  Ion Țiriac /  Guillermo Vilas 6–1, 7–5

References

External links
 ITF tournament edition details

South Orange Open
South Orange Open
South Orange Open
South Orange Open
South Orange Open
Tennis tournaments in New Jersey
South Orange Open